Church of the Epiphany located at Washington Place and Centre Avenue in the Hill District neighborhood of Pittsburgh, Pennsylvania, was built in 1902.   The church was added to the List of Pittsburgh History and Landmarks Foundation Historic Landmarks in 1998. It is situated next to PPG Paints Arena.

References

External links

 
 Epiphany Church Website
 Printers' Mass at Epiphany

Roman Catholic churches in Pittsburgh
Roman Catholic churches in Pennsylvania
Roman Catholic Diocese of Pittsburgh
Roman Catholic churches completed in 1902
Gothic Revival church buildings in Pennsylvania
20th-century Roman Catholic church buildings in the United States